SAM Intercontinental was a charter airline based in Bamako, Mali. Its main base is Senou International Airport.

Fleet

As of 2020 SAM International has no own aircraft.
(ch-avition.com states "Out of Business" ).

Former fleet 
As of April 2019, the SAM Intercontinental fleet consisted of the following aircraft:

References

External links
SAM Intercontinental Fleet

Airlines of Mali
Airlines established in 2008
Charter airlines
Companies based in Bamako
2008 establishments in Africa